Willy is a masculine given name or nickname. Willy or Willie may also refer to:

Music
 Willie – Before His Time, a 1977 album by country singer Willie Nelson
 "Willy", a song by Joni Mitchell from Ladies of the Canyon
 "Willie", a 2006 song by Cat Power from The Greatest

Other uses
 slang for the penis
 Willy (surname), a list of people with the surname Willy or Willie
 Willy (TV series), an American situation comedy
 Willy (textile machine)
 SS Willy, a Dutch cargo ship in service from 1938 to 1939
 Willie, Georgia, a community in the United States
 Willie Lake, a lake in Minnesota
 Willie: An Autobiography, an autobiography by Willie Nelson with the assistance of Bud Shrake

See also

 "Willy-willy", Australian name for a dust devil wind phenomenon
 Wili (disambiguation)
 Willys, an American automobile brand name, noted for its design of the Jeep
 John Willys, (1873–1935), founder of Willys automobile company
 Willies (disambiguation)
 William Lee (disambiguation), including Will Lee
 Billy (disambiguation)